Echtzeit is the sixth studio album by German electronic band Qluster. It was released in March 2016 under Bureau B.

Track list

References

2016 albums
Bureau B albums
Electronic albums by German artists